The Michigan Association of Broadcasters represents radio and television broadcasters across the U.S. state of Michigan. It gives out yearly awards to both of these categories, including "Lifetime Achievement", "Hall of Fame", and "Broadcast Excellence Awards."

Leadership 

Peter Tanz (Chairman 2017-2018)
Gary Baxter (Vice Chair/Chair-Elect 2017-2018)
Zoe Burdine-Fly (Secretary/Treasurer 2017-2018)
Stephen Marks (At-Large Director 2017-2018)
Debbie Kenyon (Immediate Past Chair 2017-2018)
Karole L. White (President/CEO)
A. Thomas Hahn (Executive Vice-President/Finance)

References

External links 
 

Television organizations in the United States
Radio organizations in the United States
Organizations based in Michigan